Cathalistis orinephela is a moth in the family Eriocottidae. It was described by Edward Meyrick in 1917. It is found in South Africa.

The wingspan is about 26 mm. The forewings are grey, suffusedly irrorated (sprinkled) with whitish. The hindwings are whitish grey.

References

Endemic moths of South Africa
Moths described in 1917
Eriocottidae
Lepidoptera of South Africa